Ep 2000 is the second EP by Canadian rock group GrimSkunk released in 2000. Tracks 1 and 4 would later appear on the album Seventh Wave.

Track listing 
Check-moé ben aller (Bring Me Down)
Misfit
Right On (Rock 'n' Roll Dream)
My Girlfriend

References 
Bande à part profile

GrimSkunk albums
2000 EPs
Indica Records albums